The DKW Meisterklasse (English: "Master Class"), also known as the DKW F89, is a compact front-wheel drive saloon manufactured by Auto Union GmbH between 1950 and 1954. It was the first passenger car to be manufactured by the new Auto Union company in West Germany following the re-establishment of the business in the west in 1949.

The Factory
Apart from the former DKW factory at Berlin-Spandau, the Auto Union’s manufacturing plants had been located in Saxony at Zwickau, Chemnitz and Zschopau when war had put an end to passenger vehicle production in 1942. After the war the company was no longer able to access its production facilities in the Soviet occupation zone. The first post war DKWs were therefore built under contract in a refurbished plant by Rheinmetall-Borsig in Düsseldorf.

The Origins
The F89 shared its underpinnings with the DKW F8 / 'Meisterklasse' which had been available between 1939 and 1942, but the F89 has a steel body based on that of the DKW F9, a prototype which would have directly replaced the F8 on the Zwickau production lines had the war not intervened. Although many of the machine tools at that plant were crated up and shipped to the Soviet Union in 1945, Zwickau’s new controllers also built their own version of the DKW F9 prototype, and indeed the eastern version was put into production as the IFA F9, probably shortly before the Düsseldorf built F89.

The F89 was not the first vehicle built by Auto Union after the war. That honor goes to the DKW F89 L “Schnelllaster”, Rapid Transporter in English, a curiously modern light van built on the same chassis and using the same engine / transmission package, introduced in 1949.

The Body 
The form of the saloon’s body closely followed that of the prewar DKW F9. However, extensive ‘streamlining’ had been applied to the earlier design, and impressive claims were made for the F89’s lowered wind resistance.

In 1951 a two-seater hardtop coupe version, built by coach builders Hebmüller of Wuppertal became available, and the range was completed in October 1951 with the addition of a three-door estate version, employing a body conversion that made extensive use of timber, which was replaced in March 1953 by an all-steel body. The F89 estate, like its steel bodied, successors, was branded as the ‘Universal’.

Technical
The F89 featured a two-cylinder two-stroke engine of 684 cc with a stated output, at launch, of 23 bhp. A maximum speed of 100 km/h (62 mph) was claimed for the saloon (95 km/h / 59 mph for the 'Universal' estate). The engine was water-cooled, but there was no water pump. Cooling was by a convection-based  thermosiphon system. The front wheels were connected to the engine by means of a three-speed manual gear box controlled via a dash-board mounted Krückstockschaltung lever similar to that familiar to later generations from its application in the Citroën 2CV and Renault 4. Towards the end of the production run a four-speed manual box was offered on the Meisterklasse.

Data

See also
DKW Schnellaster

Sources and further reading

F89
Compact cars
Front-wheel-drive vehicles
Cars introduced in 1950